The Duke of Wellington is a pub at 63 Eaton Terrace, Belgravia, London.

It is a Grade II listed building, built in the early 19th century.

References

External links
 
 

Grade II listed pubs in the City of Westminster